Ophraella notata is a species of skeletonizing leaf beetle in the family Chrysomelidae.

References

Galerucinae
Articles created by Qbugbot
Beetles described in 1801
Taxa named by Johan Christian Fabricius